The men's 400 metres at the 2013 World Championships in Athletics was held at the Luzhniki Stadium on 11–13 August.

The final had the 2008 Olympic Champion/2009 World Champion LaShawn Merritt and current defending champion and Olympic champion Kirani James in lanes 6 and 5 respectively. At the gun, Merritt took it out hard, passing Luguelín Santos to his outside and leaving him a couple meters behind at the halfway mark. James worked hard along the backstretch and into the turn to keep up with Merritt reaching the final straight two meters back, Jonathan Borlée one meter further back while the rest of the field almost 5 meters back with Santos the last out of the turn. Then the long striding James began to flail in quicksand. As Merritt charged home for the personal best 43.74 win, James fell back through the field. In lane 4, Tony McQuay asserted himself against the rest of the field, the first to pass James and run home for the silver. Borlée was clearly the next but Santos came from dead last to catch him just before the line to take the bronze.

Records
Prior to the competition, the records were as follows:

Qualification standards

Schedule

Results

Heats
Qualification: First 4 in each heat (Q) and the next 4 fastest (q) advanced to the semifinals.

Semifinals
Qualification: First 2 in each heat (Q) and the next 2 fastest (q) advanced to the final.

Final
The final was held at 21:50.

References

External links
400 metres results at IAAF website

400
400 metres at the World Athletics Championships